Leonard Nathaniel Goldsmid-Montefiore (2 June 1889 – 23 December 1961) was a wealthy member of the Montefiore family, the only son of Claude Montefiore, and he succeeded his father as a leader of Jewish philanthropic organisations in the UK including the Anglo-Jewish Association, the Central British Fund for German Jewry, and the Jewish Board of Guardians. He was a founder and president of the Wiener Library for the Study of the Holocaust and Genocide.

Early life
He was the only son of Claude Montefiore—a prominent Jewish scholar and philanthropist—and was named after his uncle Leonard A. Montefiore. He was born at the family home of number 12, Portman Square on 2 June 1889. His mother, Therese Alice, died on the following day, and so he was brought up by his grandmother, Emma Montefiore, who was from the wealthy Goldsmid family.

He was educated at Clifton College and Balliol College, Oxford, where he read history. While a student, he spent time in Berlin and Hanover, where he became fluent in German. After graduation, he worked and lived at Toynbee Hall—a settlement house in which rich people lived alongside the poor to do social work and alleviate poverty.

In 1914, at the start of the First World War, he joined a cycling battalion of the Royal Hampshire Regiment. He served in India and Siberia, rising to the rank of captain. In 1918, he was admitted to the Order of the British Empire, and in 1921 he joined the Athenaeum Club, being introduced by Viscount Milner.

In 1924, he married the sister of a close friend from college, Muriel Jeanetta Tuck (1892–1988), who was from the wealthy family that ran Raphael Tuck & Sons. They had two sons, David and Alan, who became a physician and Oxford don.  In 1924, he also campaigned in Soho for the election of Winston Churchill as an Independent, in the Westminster Abbey by-election.

Charitable service
Leonard Montefiore was active in numerous charitable, cultural, and philanthropic organisations. Chaim Bermant wrote, "He attended them all, gave money to them all, offered guidance to them all".

These organisation included:
 Anglo-Jewish Association – president, vice-president, chairman of the industrial committee
 Bernhard Baron Settlement
 Central British Fund for German Jewry
 Clifton College – governor
 Froebel Educational Institute – chairman 1939–1961
 Jewish Association for the Protection of Girls and Women
 Jewish Board of Guardians – chairman of the industrial committee
 Jewish Colonization Association
 Jewish Refugees Committee – chairman
 Jews’ Free School
 Jews’ Temporary Shelter
 League of British Jews
 Leo Baeck College – chairman
 Reform Synagogues Association – president
 West London Synagogue – reader, senior treasurer, vice-president and warden
 Wiener Library – founder and president

Germany and the Second World War
When Adolf Hitler became Chancellor of Germany in 1933 and his National Socialist party seized power, they threatened the Jewish community in Germany. Montefiore was at that time co-chairman of the Joint Foreign Committee of the Anglo-Jewish Association and the Board of Deputies of British Jews; the other co-chairman was Neville Laski. This committee had a tradition of protecting and supporting overseas Jews and it then established the Central British Fund for German Jewry. Another founder member was Otto Schiff, who organised the Jewish Refugees Committee, which Montefiore chaired. The wealth supporting this fund enabled a promise to be made to the British government that Jewish refugees from Germany would not be a burden on public finances. They also lobbied British society to protest against German discrimination against Jews but were not successful initially. Others wanted to organise a boycott of German goods but the Board of Deputies saw this as too extreme. There was also concern about Zionist influence, which the Board opposed as subverting their status as British. Montefiore was himself opposed to Zionism until he visited Israel in 1955.  

Montefiore's fluency in the German language enabled him to study the details of the oppression of the Jews in Germany. He publicised these, writing articles, letters and pamphlets including The Jews in Germany: Facts and Figures (1934) and Exiles from Germany (1937).

In 1944, he toured the Mediterranean theatre to meet Jewish servicemen for the Welfare Branch of the War Office.

The Windermere children
Montefiore organised aid for hundreds of Jewish orphans after the Second World War, acting as their guardian and arranging for them to be flown to England in heavy bombers by the RAF. They had been liberated from Nazi concentration camps and so required care and rehabilitation for which he arranged a special camp at Windermere. Montefiore made regular visits and took a personal interest in their development. Nurse Eva Kahn-Minden recalled his manner,

This refugee rescue was dramatised as The Windermere Children and broadcast by the BBC in 2020 for the 75th anniversary of the liberation of Auschwitz. In this production, the part of Leonard Montefiore was played by Tim McInnerny.

References

1889 births
1961 deaths
Alumni of Balliol College, Oxford
British Reform Jews
Jewish British philanthropists
Members of the Order of the British Empire
Rescue of Jews during the Holocaust
Royal Hampshire Regiment officers
Wiener Library